Doreen is a suburb in Melbourne, Victoria, Australia,  north-east of Melbourne's Central Business District, located within the City of Whittlesea and Shire of Nillumbik local government areas. Doreen recorded a population of 27,122 at the 2021 census.

Patrick Reid settled the area in 1844, calling it "Hazel Glen". The Post Office opened on 8 December 1870 as Hazelglen, and was renamed Doreen in 1895.

The area has a community hall and a Country Fire Authority fire station.

History

Doreen was initially established by Europeans in the year 1844. One of these early settlers was Patrick Reid. Reid had a holding over the land, calling the area "Hazel Glen". In 1862, Reid's holdings over the land were subdivided into farmland, which lead to further settler coming to the area. The increase in settlers within the area lead to the construction of a Methodist church on the corner of Yan Yean Road and Chapel Lane, which was opened in 1862.

The Doreen name comes from John Gavan Duffy, the Victorian Postmaster-General and a member of the Legislative Assembly.

Hazel Glen Common School (currently Doreen Primary) was later built by the local community and was completed in 1867. The school later received aid from the government on 1 July 1868, and was then recognized as Hazel Glen Common School No.945.

Demographic

According to the data collected in the 2016 census, Doreen recorded a population of 21,298 people.

Gender
48.5% Male, 51.5% Female.

Age
The median age for Doreen is 31, this is 6 years younger than the state median and 7 younger than the national median.

Birth Place
An approximate 81.0% of the population were born in Australia.
The five most common international birth countries were:
 England 2.9%
 India 1.4%
 New Zealand 1.2%
 Italy 0.8%
 Sri Lanka 0.7%

Education

Local Schools
As of August 2018, there are currently six schools housed within the suburb of Doreen.

Tertiary education
The Bundoora campus of RMIT is an approximate 15 minute drive, with the Bundoora campus of La Trobe University an approximate 30 minute drive.

Suburban development

Doreen is unusual in that it can be divided into two smaller areas, with Yan Yean Road being the divider;
 The eastern portion lies within the Shire of Nillumbik and remains rural, being contiguous with the rural localities of Yarrambat and Nutfield. 
 The western portion lies within the City of Whittlesea and has seen the development of suburban housing and facilities. It is contiguous with the suburbs of Mernda and South Morang.

Residential development is of two kinds: 
 Rural residential estates and nurseries to the south.
 A residential estate, Laurimar, in the north is being developed by Delfin, a subsidiary of Lend Lease Corporation, with an emphasis on "semi-rural" living.

Doreen is very green and quite hilly and is surrounded by the foothills of the Yarra Ranges to the east and north and the forested banks of the Plenty River to the west. As part of it being on the urban fringe, it has a wide variety of animal life including bird life. To the north is Yan Yean Reservoir, which is the oldest reservoir in Melbourne.

Facilities

A mobile library that visits Doreen is operated by Yarra Plenty Regional Library

Transport

Bus
Four bus routes service Doreen:
 : Mernda station – Diamond Creek station. Operated by Dysons.
 : Whittlesea – Greensborough Plaza via Mernda station. Operated by Dysons.
 : Mernda station – Mernda station via Doreen (anti-clockwise loop). Operated by Dysons.
 : Mernda station – Mernda station via Doreen (clockwise loop). Operated by Dysons.

Train
Mernda station, located in neighbouring Mernda, is the nearest railway station to Doreen, and is the terminus for the Mernda line.

References

External links
 Doreen (Shire of Nillumbik)
 City of Whittlesea

Suburbs of Melbourne
Suburbs of the Shire of Nillumbik
Suburbs of the City of Whittlesea